Married... with Children season 4 is a list of episodes for the fourth season of the television series Married... with Children. It ran from  the year to 1989 1990.

Plot

This season saw the departure of Marcy's husband Steve Rhoades. Marcy remained single for the remainder of the season. This was also the first season where the audience would applaud when a major character would enter a scene for the first time in the episode, the first time that Buck "speaks", as well as a Bundyesque of the classic film It's a Wonderful Life.  In the episode "It's a Bundyful Life (Part 2)," Ted McGinley makes a guest appearance as Norman Jablonsky before reappearing as a regular cast member in the next season as Jefferson D'arcy. Also, Michael Faustino makes his third guest appearance.

David Garrison missed two episodes this season. Amanda Bearse also missed one episode.

Episodes

References

1989 American television seasons
1990 American television seasons
04